Cue was a weekly magazine that covered theatre and arts events in New York from 1932 to 1980, when it was taken over by New York magazine.

Cue was the first of the city magazines, serving as a model for those that followed.

History
Cue was founded in 1932 by Mort Glankoff.

Claudette Colbert was on the cover of the first issue. The magazine's focus was evident from its various taglines over the years:
 Naborhood  Theater Guide
 The Weekly Magazine of Stage and Screen
 The Weekly Magazine of New York Life
 New York's own Entertainment Magazine
 New York's only complete entertainment weekly
 Where to go -- What to do -- in New York
 The complete entertainment guid for New York and the Suburbs
 For New York and the SuburbsThe complete entertainment guide.

Cue was an early listings magazine. BBC's Radio Times listed radio schedules in 1923.  Cue, with its city-specific focus, was the model for a genre that came to include Time Out, which now has 108 city editions. 

Glankoff sold Cue to Rupert Murdoch's New York mmagazine in 1980. Cue was prized for its listings section. Glankoff died in August 1986.

See also

Media of New York City

References

External links
 Cue 1948–1980 at Stanford Libraries

Weekly magazines published in the United States
Lifestyle magazines published in the United States
Magazines established in 1932
Magazines published in New York City
Listings magazines